Fontenelle-en-Brie (literally Fontenelle in Brie) is a former commune in the department of Aisne in northern France. On 1 January 2016, it was merged into the new commune Dhuys-et-Morin-en-Brie.

Population

See also
Communes of the Aisne department

References

Former communes of Aisne
Aisne communes articles needing translation from French Wikipedia
Populated places disestablished in 2016